Cha Joo-young is a South Korean actress. She is known for her roles in dramas such as Cheese in the Trap, Wok of Love, Jugglers, The Spies Who Loved Me., and The Glory.

Filmography

Television series

Awards and nominations

References

External links
 
 

1990 births
Living people
21st-century South Korean actresses
South Korean female models
South Korean television actresses